King Charles (born Charles Costa) is an English singer-songwriter from West London.

Charles plays the guitar, piano, and cello. He is also a classically trained singer. He began writing songs when he was 17.

In 2009, he became the first British person to win the International Songwriting Competition in Nashville, Tennessee, for his song "Love Lust". The competition was judged by Tom Waits, Jeff Beck, Loretta Lynn and Jerry Lee Lewis, and following this victory King Charles was signed by Universal Republic/Island.

In 2012, he teamed up with the record producer Matthew Wilder and released his first album Loveblood, to critical devastation  and charted at No. 36 in the UK Albums Chart.

After an extensive international touring period he released his second album, Gamble for a Rose, in 2014. Produced by Marcus Mumford, it saw Costa return to his folk roots whilst keeping a modern edge to his sound.

In 2020, Costa teamed up again with Matthew Wilder on Out of my Mind. In April 2020, Clash magazine noted "They say the freaks shall inherit the earth, and it will be King Charles will crush them all with his outrageous, god sized ego'.

Discography

Studio albums

Singles

References

External links 

New band of the day – No 653: King Charles
BBC – Glastonbury 2009 – King Charles

1985 births
Living people
English male singer-songwriters
21st-century English singers
21st-century British male singers